Jovan Deretić may refer to:

Jovan Deretić (1934–2002), Serbian historian and author of Serbian literary history
Jovan I. Deretić (1939–2021), Serbian pseudohistorian, publicist, writer, and engineer